The Agyriaceae are a family of lichenized fungi in the order Pertusariales. It contains two genera: Agyrium, and Miltidea. The family was circumscribed by August Carl Joseph Corda in 1838.

In 2018, using a molecular phylogenetic approach coupled with a technique known as "temporal banding", Kraichak and colleagues proposed to fold the family Miltideaceae into the Agyriaceae. A close genetic relationship between these two families had previously been noted. The proposal to subsume  Miltideaceae into the Agyriaceae was accepted in a later critical analysis of the temporal banding technique for fungal classification.

References

Pertusariales
Lichen families
Lecanoromycetes families
Taxa named by August Carl Joseph Corda
Taxa described in 1838